Scottomyzon is a monotypic genus of crustaceans belonging to the monotypic family Scottomyzontidae. The only species is Scottomyzon gibberum .

References

Siphonostomatoida
Copepod genera
Monotypic crustacean genera